"Esprit de Corps" is the twenty-fifth episode of the third series of the 1960s cult British spy-fi television series The Avengers, starring Patrick Macnee and Honor Blackman. It was first broadcast by ABC on 14 March 1964. The episode was directed by Don Leaver and written by Eric Paice.

Plot
Steed and Cathy investigate the murder of a soldier and uncover a plot to stage a coup d'état against the British government. The regal Mrs Gale meets a strangler who's not a true gentleman.

Cast
 Patrick Macnee as John Steed
 Honor Blackman as Cathy Gale
 Duncan Macrae as Brigadier General Sir Ian Stuart-Bollinger 
 Joyce Heron as Lady Dorothy Stuart-Bollinger 
 Roy Kinnear as Private Jessop 
 John Thaw as Captain Trench 
 Pearl Catlin as Mrs. Angela Craig 
 Doug Robinson as Sergeant Marsh 
 Hugh Morton as Admiral, Harry 
 Anthony Blackshaw as Private Hamish Asquith
 James Falkland as Signaller
 George Alexander as Piper
 George Macrae as Highland Dancer
 Tony Lambden as Drummer

References

External links

Episode overview on The Avengers Forever! website

The Avengers (season 3) episodes
1964 British television episodes